"How much wood would a woodchuck chuck" (sometimes phrased with "could" rather than "would") is an American English-language tongue-twister. The woodchuck, a word originating from Algonquian "wejack", is a kind of marmot, regionally called a groundhog. The complete beginning of the tongue-twister usually goes: "How much wood would a woodchuck chuck if a woodchuck could chuck wood?" The tongue-twister relies primarily on alliteration to achieve its effects, with five "w" sounds interspersed among five "ch" sounds, as well as 6 "ood" sounds.

Answers
A traditional, if nonsensical, "response" to the question is: "A woodchuck would chuck as much wood as a woodchuck could chuck if a woodchuck could chuck wood".  Other — similarly unhelpful — responses include "So much wood would a woodchuck chuck as a woodchuck would if a woodchuck could chuck wood!",  "He would chuck, he would, as much as he could, and chuck as much wood as a woodchuck would if a woodchuck could chuck wood.", and "As much wood as a woodchuck would if a woodchuck could chuck wood!"

A 1957 Associated Press piece refers to the question as "a riddle which beats the Sphinx, since it's still unanswered". Another study, which considered "chuck" to be the opposite of upchucking, determined that a woodchuck could ingest  of wood per day.

Origin
The origin of the phrase is from a 1902 song "The Woodchuck Song", written by Robert Hobart Davis for Fay Templeton in the musical The Runaways. The lyrics became better known in a 1904 version of the song written by Theodore Morse, with a chorus of "How much wood would a woodchuck chuck if a woodchuck could chuck wood?", which was recorded by Ragtime Roberts, in 1904.

The tongue-twister is documented as "folklore" in 1972 at Farmington, Michigan. It is used in the title of Werner Herzog's 1976 film How Much Wood Would a Woodchuck Chuck, a documentation of the World Livestock Auctioneer Championship in New Holland, Pennsylvania.

Popular culture
Google features this tongue twister as an Easter egg in its search engine, as well as Google Now. Several other virtual assistants, including Siri and Cortana, have their own unique, humorous responses to the phrase.
 In the parody-filled video game Monkey Island 2: LeChuck's Revenge, Guybrush Threepwood asks a carpenter the question and gets a slight variation of the response: "A woodchuck would chuck no amount of wood since a woodchuck can't chuck wood." The conversation continues in a similar manner until Threepwood tells the carpenter that "a woodchuck should chuck if a woodchuck could chuck wood, as long as a woodchuck would chuck wood".
 Ludacris incorporates this tongue twister in the Chamillionaire single "Creepin' (Solo)".
 A British YouTube personality, KSI used a version of the phrase in his song titled "Earthquake", which achieved over 30 million views. The line in question asks another YouTuber, Behzinga, 'how much wood could a woodchuck chuck if a woodchuck looked like you?'
American rapper Tyler, the Creator used an explicit version of the phrase on his hit song, "Tamale". His rendition of the phrase is "How much wood could a woodchuck chuck if a woodchuck could ever give a fuck?"
South Park character Eric Cartman, dressed as AWESOM-O, answered "seventeen".
Swedish disc jockey and musician Aronchupa released a song with the same title in 2020.

See also
Alliteration
Announcer's test
Malapropism
Spoonerism
Theophilus Thistle

References

Fictional rodents
Tongue-twisters
1902 songs
Songs about language
Songs about mammals
Groundhogs